The  occurred on the Sanriku coast of the Tōhoku region of Honshū, Japan on March 2 with a moment magnitude of 8.4. The associated tsunami caused widespread devastation.

Earthquake
The main shock occurred at 02:31 AM local time on March 3, 1933 (17:31 UTC March 2, 1933) and measured 8.4 on the moment magnitude scale. It was in approximately the same location as the 1896 Sanriku earthquake and it occurred far enough away from the town that shaking did little damage. Approximately three hours after the main shock there was a magnitude 6.8 aftershock, followed by 76 more aftershocks (with a magnitude of 5.0 or greater) over a period of six months. This was an intraplate event that occurred within the Pacific Plate, and the focal mechanism showed normal faulting.

Damage
The tsunami destroyed over 7,000 homes along the northern Japanese coastline, of which over 4,885 were washed away. The death toll came to 1,522 people confirmed dead, 1,542 missing, and 12,053 injured. Hardest hit was the town of Tarō, Iwate (now part of Miyako city), with 98% of its houses destroyed and 42% of its population killed.

See also
List of earthquakes in 1933
List of earthquakes in Japan
Seismicity of the Sanriku coast

Notes

External links
 Historic video footage of devastation following 1933 Sanriku Earthquake
 

Sanriku
Sanriku
March 1933 events
1933 tsunamis
Earthquakes in the Empire of Japan
Tsunamis in Japan
Earthquakes of the Showa period
1933 disasters in Japan